Sir Arthur Morgan (1856–1916) was an Australian politician and Premier of Queensland from 1903 to 1906.

Early life
Morgan was born in Warwick, Queensland. He is the fourth son of James Morgan (who later represented Warwick in the Legislative Assembly of Queensland and later became the chairman of committees) and his wife Kate, née Barton. Morgan was educated at a public school at Warwick and then joined the staff of the Warwick Argus, which was owned and edited by his father. Morgan married Alice Augusta Clinton (daughter of H. E. Clinton) on 26 July 1880.

Career
Morgan became a member of the Warwick Municipal Council in 1885 and served as mayor since 1886–1890 and again in 1898. In 1887 he was elected a member of the Queensland Legislative Assembly for the district of Warwick, and held this seat until 1896. In 1899, he was re-elected to this seat, and in that same year was chosen as the Speaker of the Legislative Assembly of Queensland.

In 1903, businessman and politician Robert Philp resigned as Premier of Queensland on account of defections from his party, and the leader of the Labor party being unable to form a ministry. Morgan was asked to lead a combination of a group of liberals and the labor party. He later resigned the speakership, and went on to form a ministry. After that, he held the positions of the premier, chief secretary, secretary for railways, and vice-president of the executive council. Morgan's policy of retrenchment made him unpopular, and his alliance with the labor party was seen as questionable by his former associates. In January 1906, after the death of Sir Hugh Nelson, Morgan was appointed as president of the Queensland Legislative Council and was acting-governor on two occasions. In 1908 he was appointed to the seat of Lieutenant-Governor of Queensland.

He published a manuscript in 1902 entitled Discovery and Development of the Downs, and was knighted in 1907.

Later life

In his later years, Morgan's health began to fail, and he died on 20 December 1916. Morgan was survived by his wife, five sons and three daughters.

References
Rod Kirkpatrick, 'Morgan, Sir Arthur (1856 - 1916)', Australian Dictionary of Biography, Vol. 10, MUP, 1986, pp 584–585. Retrieved 2009-10-15

Morgan, Sir Arthur — Brisbane City Council Grave Location Search

External links

1856 births
1916 deaths
Premiers of Queensland
Australian Knights Bachelor
Australian politicians awarded knighthoods
Members of the Queensland Legislative Assembly
Members of the Queensland Legislative Council
Burials at Toowong Cemetery
Presidents of the Queensland Legislative Council
Speakers of the Queensland Legislative Assembly